Baba Qarah (also Romanized as Bābā Qarah) is a village in Balaband Rural District, in the Central District of Fariman County, Razavi Khorasan Province, Iran. At the 2006 census, its population was 114, in 26 families.

See also 

 List of cities, towns and villages in Razavi Khorasan Province

References 

Populated places in Fariman County